Charlie Trafford (born 24 May 1992) is a Canadian professional soccer player who plays as a midfielder for Cavalry FC.

Club career

Youth and College
Born in Calgary, Alberta, Trafford spent time playing local youth soccer before joining the Whitecaps Residency. He later played college soccer with York University, and also spent time with Dutch club De Graafschap. In  2012, he played with SC Toronto of the Canadian Soccer League.

Finland

Trafford began his senior professional career in Finland, playing with IFK Mariehamn, TPS and KuPS. While with KuPS, Trafford won their 2014 Player of the Year and Goal of the Year awards.

Poland
Trafford signed with Ekstraklasa club Korona Kielce on 24 November 2015. He made his debut against Pogoń Szczecin on 15 February 2016. Trafford would struggle to receive playing time with Korona Kielce, and in March 2017 would transfer to Polish First League side Sandecja Nowy Sącz.

Return to Finland
Trafford returned to Finland and signed with RoPS on 14 July 2017. He made his debut for them against FC Lahti on 16 July.

Scotland
After only a month with RoPS, Trafford transferred to Scottish side Inverness Caledonian Thistle on 18 August 2017. He made his debut the next day against Greenock Morton. Trafford would start regularly for the club during his first two months, but would lose his starting spot after injuring his thumb. Trafford would be in and out of the starting lineup during his first 2.5 years at Inverness, showing good form when getting a regular run of games. He left the club at the end of the 2019–20 season. He then signed for Hamilton Academical. On 19 May 2021 it was announced that he would leave Hamilton at the end of the season, following the expiry of his contract.

Wales
Trafford signed with National League side Wrexham on 25 October 2021, signing a short team deal following a successful trial. In January 2022, it was announced that Trafford's contract had expired without making an appearance for the club.

Cavalry FC
On 17 February 2022, Trafford signed a two-year contract with his hometown club, Canadian Premier League side Cavalry FC, where he joined his cousin Mason.

International career
Trafford received his first call up to the Canadian national team on 6 October 2015 as a replacement for Kyle Bekker, who withdrew from the squad due to injury. He earned his first cap seven days later on 13 October, starting in central midfield against Ghana.

Personal life
His cousin Mason Trafford is also a professional soccer player with Cavalry FC in Canada. Both have played for IFK Mariehamn and Mason arranged for Charlie to sign for the club.

Career statistics

References

External links

1992 births
Living people
Canadian soccer players
Soccer players from Calgary
Association football midfielders
Canadian expatriate soccer players
Canadian expatriate sportspeople in the Netherlands
Expatriate footballers in the Netherlands
Canadian expatriate sportspeople in Finland
Expatriate footballers in Finland
Canadian expatriate sportspeople in Poland
Expatriate footballers in Poland
Canadian expatriate sportspeople in Scotland
Expatriate footballers in Scotland
Canadian expatriate sportspeople in Wales
Expatriate footballers in Wales
Vancouver Whitecaps Residency players
De Graafschap players
SC Toronto players
IFK Mariehamn players
Turun Palloseura footballers
Kuopion Palloseura players
Korona Kielce players
Rovaniemen Palloseura players
Inverness Caledonian Thistle F.C. players
Hamilton Academical F.C. players
Calgary Foothills FC players
Wrexham A.F.C. players
Cavalry FC players
Canadian Soccer League (1998–present) players
Veikkausliiga players
Ekstraklasa players
Scottish Professional Football League players
Canadian Premier League players
Canada men's international soccer players